The Muskegon Belles were a women's professional baseball team that played in the All-American Girls Professional Baseball League during the 1953 season. The Belles were based in Muskegon, Michigan.

History

The Muskegon Belles played in 1953, with their home games played at Marsh Field. This made Muskegon the only city in AAGPBL history to host multiple teams. Previously, the Muskegon Lassies had played there from  through .

The new Belles team was also the third edition of a franchise. One of the All-American Girls Professional Baseball League's four charter franchises, the original club was founded in Racine, Wisconsin for the 1943 inaugural. Then the Racine Belles, the team moved to Battle Creek, Michigan in 1951, was renamed the Battle Creek Belles and played for two years, before being replaced by the Muskegon Belles.

The 1953 Belles were the worst in the league. The team finished with a 39–70 record and folded after the end of the season, leaving the AAGPBL with just five teams for its final season in 1954.

All-time roster

References

Further reading
 All-American Girls Professional Baseball League Record Book – W. C. Madden. Publisher: McFarland & Company. Format: Paperback, 294pp. Language: English. 

All-American Girls Professional Baseball League teams
1953 establishments in Michigan
1953 disestablishments in Michigan
Baseball teams established in 1953
Baseball teams disestablished in 1953
Sports in Muskegon, Michigan
Defunct baseball teams in Michigan
Women's sports in Michigan